Hans Krüger (29 May 1898 in Lübeck – 27 March 1988 in Niefern-Öschelbronn) was a pharmacist, anthroposophist, botanist, lecturer and researcher.

Life
His father came from Mecklenburg and taught at a grammar school in Lübeck. His mother was from Lübeck. Her father moved from Silesia to Lübeck as a young pharmacist and established a studio as a photographer, a new art at that time.

Science interested the young Krüger particularly aquaria and terraria. He had a large collection of snails and seashells. The study of Haeckel's basic law of biogenetics caught the attention of the young scholar.

1917 did military service, first in Poland and Russia border region and in 1918 in the offensive in northern France. His older brother sent him Rudolf Steiner's Knowledge of the Higher Worlds while on the eastern front. After the war he studied at Kiel University. He studied science at first but after the first semester switched to theology as this seemed more important to him during the time. In Berlin his brother drew his attention to Rudolf Steiner's Theosophy and it was this book that brought him to Anthroposophy. He joined the Berlin branch of the Anthroposophical Society in 1920. He attended a small anthroposophical group of theology students that year and heard Rudolf Steiner lecture in Stuttgart. He was in attendance at the first course for university students at the Goetheanum.

He decided to pursue a career in pharmacy and later practiced in Lübeck and then Berlin. 1921 he attended anthroposophical courses for university students in Darmstadt and heard Wilhelm Pelikan speak. In Berlin he involved himself in the Independent Anthroposophical Society and took part in performing the Oberufer Christmas plays. He continued his studies in pharmacy from 1924 at the same time working part-time at the pharmaceutical laboratories of the Institute of Clinical Medicine. For the next 18 months he worked in pharmacies in Bochum. He married Frieda Meinelt.

July 1927 he started to work at the Weleda pharmaceutical works in Schwäbisch Gmünd. The firm was then still in its beginning. He set up ampoule production. Together with Schmiedel, Pelikan and Spiess he was one of the original workers in pharmacy at the Weleda.

On suggestion of Rudolf Steiner he worked with Ehrenfried Pfeiffer and Dr. Alla Selawry to develop the method of sensitive copper chloride crystallization to study the quality of substance and life. The effects of biodynamic fertilizers were also investigated.

Works
He published a number of essays. He took care to maintain links with physicians, farmers and the Science Section at the Goetheanum. Hie last major task was to put together all Rudolf Steiner's references to medicinal agents, a task he worked at for years with great care. This work is a valuable reference for physicians and pharmacists.

References

1898 births
1988 deaths
German pharmacists
Anthroposophic medicine practitioners